The 2021 TCR New Zealand Touring Car Championship (known for commercial reasons as the Allied Petroleum TCR New Zealand Championship) will be the inaugural season of the TCR New Zealand Touring Car Championship.

Teams and drivers 
All teams are based and registered in New Zealand.

Race calendar 
The 2020 calendar was announced on April 30, 2019. It was also announced that the summer scheduled (labelled the Sprint Championship) was scheduled to be followed by an endurance series later on in the year. The series was later rescheduled for the second half of 2020, then for March 2021 with three rounds.

Results

Summary

Standings

References

External links
 

TCR
New Zealand